The 1769 Census was the first census covering the Oldenburg State: the Kingdom of Denmark, the Kingdom of Norway (including the Faroese Islands and Iceland), the Duchy of Schleswig, the Duchy of Holstein, and the Countship of Oldenburg.

Number of inhabitants

See also 
 Census in Germany

References

Literature 
 Dyrvik, Ståle: Norsk historie 1536–1814 Det Norske Samlaget. 

1769 in Denmark
1769 in Norway
1769 in Europe
18th century in Iceland
Denmark-Norway
Denmark-Norway